The 26th Directors Guild of America Awards, honoring the outstanding directorial achievements in film and television in 1973, were presented on March 16, 1974, at the Beverly Hilton.

Winners and nominees

Film

Television

Outstanding Television Director
 Joseph Sargent

Honorary Life Member
 Charlie Chaplin

References

External links
 

Directors Guild of America Awards
1973 film awards
1973 television awards
Direct
Direct
Directors